Adama Sane (born 11 June 2000) is a Senegalese professional footballer who plays as a forward for Italian  club Gelbison on loan from Hellas Verona.

Career
Born in Senegal, Sane moved to Italy in 2014. In 2015 he joined to Hellas Verona youth sector. After scored 25 goals in 26 matches for U-17 team, he was loaned to Juventus Primavera for a season.

On 23 September 2020, he was loaned to Serie C club Arezzo. Sane made his professional debut on 27 September against Feralpisalò.

On 1 February 2021, he was loaned to Mantova.

For the 2021–22 season, he joined to Latina on loan.

On 2 September 2022, Sane moved on loan to Gelbison.

References

External links
 
 

2000 births
Living people
Senegalese footballers
Association football forwards
Serie C players
Hellas Verona F.C. players
Juventus F.C. players
S.S. Arezzo players
Mantova 1911 players
Latina Calcio 1932 players
Senegalese expatriate footballers
Senegalese expatriate sportspeople in Italy
Expatriate footballers in Italy